Fadel (also spelled Fadl   or Fadil) is an Arabic masculine given name, meaning  "generous, honorable, superior". Notable people with the name include:

Given name

Fadl
 Fadl ibn Abbas (611–639), cousin of the Islamic prophet Muhammad
 Faḍl al-Shāʻirah (died 871), female poet of the Abbasid period
 Fadl Shaker (born 1969), Lebanese singer

Al Fadl
 Al-Fadl ibn Salih (740–789), Abbasid governor
 Al-Fadl ibn al-Rabi' (757/8–823/4), chamberlain and vizier of the Abbasid caliphs Harun al-Rashid and al-Amin
 Al-Fadl ibn Yahya (766–808), one of the Barmakids
 Al-Fadl ibn Sahl, vizier of the Abbasid caliph al-Ma'mun
 Abu al-Fadl Jaʿfar ibn Muhammad al-Mu'tasim (r. 847–861), Abbasid caliph better known by his laqab Al-Mutawakkil
 Al-Fadl ibn Marwan (ca. 774–864), Christian vizier of the Abbasid caliph al-Mu'tasim
 Abu al-Fadl Jaʿfar ibn Ahmad al-Mu'tadid (r. 908–932), Abbasid caliph better known by his regnal name Al-Muqtadir
 Al-Fadl ibn Jaʽfar Al-Muqtadir (r. 946–974), 10th-century caliph during the Later Abbasid era

Fadel
 Fadel Mohammed Ali, Director of Royal Maintenance Corps of the Jordanian Armed Forces
 Fadel Muhammad, Indonesian politician
 Fadel Al-Najjar, Jordanian basketball player

Fadil
 Fadil Husayn Salih Hintif, Yemeni extrajudicial prisoner of the United States
 Fadıl Öztürk, Kurdish writer and poet
 Fadil Vokrri, Albanian football player
 Fadıl Akgündüz, Turkish businessman

Fazıl
 Fazıl Say, Turkish pianist

Surname

Fadl
 Belal Fadl, Egyptian writer
 Mohamed Fadl, Egyptian footballer

Fadel
 Hussain Fadel, Kuwaiti footballer
 Leila Fadel, American journalist
 Tony Fadell, Lebanese-American engineer, designer, entrepreneur, and investor

Fadil
 Siddig El Fadil, British actor
 Hassan Fadil, Moroccan footballer
 Sherif Abdel-Fadil, Egyptian footballer

See also 
 Fadl (Islam), divine grace in Islam

Arabic-language surnames
Arabic masculine given names
Turkish masculine given names